Michael James Gaffey (born December 1, 1945) is a planetary scientist who specializes in deriving the mineralogies of asteroids from their reflectance spectra.

Biography
He received his bachelor's and master's degrees in geology from the University of Iowa and his PhD from MIT in planetary science graduating in 1974.  From 1974 to 1977, he worked as a Post-doc in the Planetary Astronomy Laboratory at MIT.  After leaving MIT, he worked as a researcher at the University of Hawaii's Institute for Astronomy from 1977 to 1979 and the Hawaii Institute of Geophysics from 1979 to 1984.  From 1984 to 2001, he taught in the geology department of the Rensselaer Polytechnic Institute.  He is currently a professor at the University of North Dakota in the Space Studies department.

Honors
In 2006 he received both the Leonard Medal from the Meteoritical Society and the G. K. Gilbert Award from the Planetary Science division of the Geological Society of America.  Asteroid 3545 Gaffey is also named in his honor.

References

University of North Dakota faculty
Massachusetts Institute of Technology School of Science alumni
Rensselaer Polytechnic Institute faculty
Living people
1945 births
Planetary scientists